Elijah James Lee (born February 8, 1996) is an American football linebacker for the National Football League (NFL). He played college football at Kansas State, and was drafted by the Minnesota Vikings in the seventh round in the 2017 NFL Draft.

Early years
Lee attended Blue Springs High School, where he played football under head coach Kelly Donohoe. He was a teammate of Kansas State running back Dalvin Warmack. During his high school career, Lee was a two-time Kansas City Star All-Metro honoree and was a two-time recipient of the Buck Buchanan Memorial Award, given to the best lineman or linebacker in the top two high school classes in Kansas or Missouri high school football in the Kansas City area, being only the second two-time winner of the award. Lee was named to the MaxPreps Junior All-American team as a junior in 2012 after collecting 71 tackles, 33.5 tackles for loss and 18.5 sacks. He was also a first-team All-State honoree by both the coaches and media. As a senior in 2013, Lee recorded 85 tackles, including 36 for loss and 12 sacks. He was selected as the Missouri Football Coaches' Association (MFCA) Class 6 Defensive Player of the Year, while he was a unanimous pick for the MFCA All-State squad. He was also named first-team All-State by the Missouri media and was selected to the USA Today All-USA Missouri Team. Lee also participated in basketball, earning all-conference and all-district honors, and track and field at Blue Springs.

Lee was regarded as a three-star recruit by Rivals.com and was rated the 39th-best outside linebacker nationally by Scout.com and 41st by Rivals. Lee committed to Kansas State on March 26, 2013. He also had scholarship offers from Iowa and Nebraska, among others.

College career
Lee made the transition from defensive end in high school to outside linebacker at Kansas State. A three-year letter winner, Lee became the first Wildcat linebacker to earn consecutive All-Big 12 honors since Arthur Brown in 2011 and 2012. Lee finished his collegiate career with 209 total tackles (153 solo), 18.5 tackles for loss, 11 sacks, 5 forced fumbles and five interceptions (the most by a Wildcat linebacker under head coach Bill Snyder). He is also tied for fourth in Kansas State bowl history with 20 career tackles. During his time at Kansas State, the Wildcats had a 24–15 record and three bowl berths prior to declaring to the NFL Draft after his junior year.

Freshman season (2014)

As a freshman in 2014, Lee played in all 13 games and totaled 19 tackles, including 4.5 sacks, a forced fumble and a pass breakup. His 4.5 sacks were the most sacks by a true freshman in school history and the second-most among all freshmen (true and redshirt), and also the most among all true freshmen in the Big 12 in 2014. He started the season off with two sacks against Stephen F. Austin, becoming the first true freshman under head coach Bill Snyder to record two sacks in a game. Against UTEP in week 4, he registered a season-high four tackles. He recorded sacks against Texas and Kansas, and a half sack at Iowa State.

Sophomore season (2015)

Lee started all 13 games as a sophomore in 2015, leading the team with 80 tackles en route to second-team All-Big 12 honors from the league’s coaches, becoming Kansas State's first underclassman linebacker to earn either first or second-team All-Big 12 honors since College Football Hall of Famer Mark Simoneau back in 1998. He was also the first Wildcat underclassman to lead the team in tackles since 2008. He finished second on the team with 7.5 tackles for loss and third with 5.0 sacks, and recorded three interceptions, the most by a linebacker since 2002. Two of his picks came against TCU on in week 5, and were the most in a game by a Wildcat linebacker since 2002. In the game against Louisiana Tech, he set career highs in tackles with 12, tackles for loss with 3.0 and sacks with a pair. He also reached double digits in tackles against Texas Tech with 11 (including a 14-yard sack). Lee also earned second-team Academic All-Big 12 honors.

Junior season (2016)

Lee led the team in tackles as a junior with 110, while adding 6.5 tackles for loss, 1.5 sacks and two interceptions en route to first-team All-Big 12 honors from the league's coaches, Associated Press (AP), ESPN.com and Phil Steele. He also earned second-team honors from Pro Football Focus (PFF), while he received votes for Big 12 Defensive Player of the Year. His 110 total tackles ranked third in the Big 12, while his 72 unassisted tackles tied for ninth in Kansas State history. During the season, he recorded at least seven tackles in 10 games, including eight of the nine Big 12 contests. He earned Big 12 Defensive Player of the Week honors following the West Virginia contest when he tallied a career-best 14 tackles, including a sack, and an interception. His effort against the Mountaineers included a career-best 12 solo stops. Lee also reached double-digit tackle marks against Stanford in the season opener contest, Oklahoma in week 6, Iowa State in week 8 and Texas A&M in the Texas Bowl. His 12 stops against the Aggies in the Texas Bowl tied for the third most in Kansas State bowl history. Lee was on the preseason watch lists for the Bednarik Award, Nagurski Trophy and Butkus Award.

Lee announced his decision Friday afternoon via Twitter.“After talking with my family and going through the tough times we have experienced this opportunity is something I can’t pass up,” Lee wrote. “At this time I will forgo my senior season and enter the upcoming 2017 NFL draft. I am looking forward to this opportunity and appreciate everyone’s support going forward.”

College statistics

Professional career

Lee did not attend the NFL Scouting Combine, because he missed the deadline after having declared for the draft in January. At Kansas State's pro day, Lee worked out with Minnesota Vikings linebackers coach Adam Zimmer. He also produced a 38-inch vertical jump, 18 repetitions on the bench press and a 122-inch broad jump. Following his pro day, Lee took a pre-draft visit to Minnesota.

Minnesota Vikings
Lee was drafted by the Minnesota Vikings in the seventh round, 232nd overall, in the 2017 NFL Draft. "I'm just proud to be a Viking," Lee said after his selection. "That was one of my favorite teams and one of my top priorities, too, because they showed so much love and also because there's Kansas State alums." He was waived on September 2, 2017, and was signed to the practice squad the next day.

San Francisco 49ers
On September 13, 2017, Lee was signed by the San Francisco 49ers off the Vikings' practice squad.

On August 31, 2019, Lee was waived by the 49ers and was signed to the practice squad the next day. He was promoted to the active roster on November 5. Lee reached Super Bowl LIV with the 49ers, but lost 31-20 to the Kansas City Chiefs.

Lee did not receive a restricted free agent tender from the 49ers after the 2019 season, and he became a free agent on March 18, 2020.

Detroit Lions
On April 1, 2020, Lee signed with the Detroit Lions. He was waived on October 29, 2020.

Cleveland Browns
On October 30, 2020, Lee was claimed off waivers by the Cleveland Browns.

On March 19, 2021, Lee re-signed with the Browns. The Browns terminated Lee's contract on August 31, 2021. Lee was re-signed to the Browns' practice squad on September 1, 2021. He was elevated to the Browns' active roster on September 11, 2021 prior to the Browns' Week 1 matchup against the Kansas City Chiefs. He was then signed to the active roster on September 18, 2021. He was released on October 5, 2021, and re-signed to the Browns' practice squad on October 6, 2021, then promoted back to the active roster two days later.

Kansas City Chiefs
Lee signed with the Kansas City Chiefs on March 24, 2022. He was released on August 30, 2022, and signed to the practice squad the next day. He was elevated to the active roster on September 10, 2022, via a standard elevation which caused him to revert back to the practice squad after the game. He was released on September 27, 2022, and signed to the practice squad the next day. He was elevated to the active roster on October 1, 2022, and then reverted back to the practice squad after the game.

Chicago Bears
On December 20, 2022, Lee was signed by the Chicago Bears off the Chiefs practice squad.

References

External links
 Kansas State Wildcats bio

1996 births
Living people
American football linebackers
Chicago Bears players
Cleveland Browns players
Detroit Lions players
Kansas City Chiefs players
Kansas State Wildcats football players
Minnesota Vikings players
Players of American football from Louisiana
San Francisco 49ers players
Sportspeople from Houma, Louisiana